Tommy Osvald Charlie Kenter (born 15 April 1950 in Copenhagen) is a Danish actor.

He had his debut already when he was 11 years old in Cirkus Buster, performing under the name Tommy Kanter. He later appeared as "fru Christoff" in the satirical TV-show Dansk Naturgas working together with Per Pallesen. He has performed in Dansk Melodi Grand Prix together with Lise Dandanel and Hanne Boel with his own song "Piano". He was played Kjeld Jensen in the Olsen-Gang film The Olsen Gang's Last Trick after the death of Poul Bundgaard during filming.

He has said that he only has one more role he needs to play before retiring as an actor, which is Molières Tartuffe

Private life 
In 2008 Kenter bought a thatched house on 200 m2 in Nærum north of Copenhagen for 7,65 mill DKK. In 2018 he tried to sell it for 8,25 mill. DKK., but house was not sold until December 2019. It was sold for 7,4 mill DKK

Filmography 
Below is a selection of roles from Tommy Kenter's career as an actor.

Film

Series

Voiceacting (Cartoons)

Theatrical plays

Discography 
 1982: Nattens sidste cigaret (Live album with Niels Jørgen Steen and others)
 1990: Uden hat og briller

Awards 
 1982 – Årets Dirch
 1991 – Bodil Award for Best Actor in a Leading Role in the movie Dance of the Polar Bears
 1991 – Robert for male leading role of the year in the movie Dance of the Polar Bears
 1994 – Teaterpokalen
 2002 – Bodil Award for Best Actor in a Supporting Role in the movie Chop Chop

References

External links 

1950 births
Living people
21st-century Danish male actors
20th-century Danish male actors
Bodil Award winners
Dansk Melodi Grand Prix contestants
Male actors from Copenhagen
Danish male voice actors